

Nesmith may refer to:

People

Surname
 Aaron Nesmith (born 1999), American basketball player
 Bette Nesmith Graham (1924–1980), typist, mother of Michael Nesmith, and inventor of liquid paper
 Brian NeSmith, American entrepreneur
 Christian Nesmith (born 1965), musician and son of Michael Nesmith
 James Nesmith (1820–1885), United States Senator from Oregon
 Jason NeSmith, also known as Casper Fandango, member of Casper & the Cookies
 Jason Nesmith (Galaxy Quest), a fictional character in Galaxy Quest film
 Jeff Nesmith, American journalist
 Matthew NeSmith, American professional golfer
 Michael Nesmith (1942–2021), member of the Monkees
 Sharon Nesmith (born 1969/70), Brigadier of the British Army

Given name
 Nesmith Ankeny (1927–1993), American mathematician
 Clifton Nesmith McArthur, a United States Representative from Oregon

Other uses
 Nesmith (singer) (born 1983), Japanese singer and dancer
 Nesmith, South Carolina

See also 
 Naismith (disambiguation)